The Wales Open was a professional golf tournament on the European Tour played at the Celtic Manor Resort. It was played annually from 2000 to 2014, as part of a 15-year deal between the tour and the Celtic Manor Resort, that included staging the 2010 Ryder Cup. The event was not held from 2015 to 2019 but returned in 2020, following a revamp of the European Tour because of the COVID-19 pandemic.

History
The 2001 event was reduced to 36 holes because of heavy rain. The third round was cancelled but organisers had hoped to play a third round on the Sunday. However, that was not possible and the result was decided over the first two rounds. Paul McGinley, Paul Lawrie and Daren Lee were tied at 6-under-par and a playoff was arranged on 12th hole, a par 3, which would be played repeatedly until a winner emerged. Lawrie dropped out of the playoff when he bogeyed the hole at the second attempt, McGinley eventually winning when Lee bogeyed the hole at the fifth try.

There was another playoff in 2004 when Paul Casey and Simon Khan tied on 267, 21-under-par. Casey had a bogey six at the second playoff hole after which Khan holed a 3-foot putt for birdie.

In 2006, Robert Karlsson broke the European Tour's 36-hole and 54-hole scoring records by scoring 124 for the first two rounds and 189 for the first three. However, as the Roman Road course was a par-69, rare at the professional level, his scores relative to par were a slightly less remarkable 14-under after two rounds and 18-under after three. Karlsson shot two-over-par for the final round, but still won. In the same year, Phillip Archer scored 60 in the first round, missing a birdie putt on the 18th green.

Sponsorship
The event started in 2000 as part of a 15-year deal between the European Tour and the Celtic Manor Resort, that included staging the 2010 Ryder Cup. It was originally known as the Celtic Manor Resort Wales Open, becoming the Celtic Manor Wales Open in 2004.

The 2011 event was called the Saab Wales Open under a one-year deal with Saab. From 2012 to 2014, the event became the ISPS Handa Wales Open, with ISPS Handa as the title sponsor, and an initial prize fund in 2012 of £1.8 million. The event was dropped after 2014.

The tournament returned in 2020 as part of a revamp of the European Tour's schedule in response to the impact of the COVID-19 pandemic. The event was the fourth event of a 6-week "UK Swing" and was again hosted at Celtic Manor and sponsored by ISPS Handa, although with reduced prize money of €1,000,000.

The 2021 event was sponsored by Cazoo as part of a multi-year sponsorship deal which also included the English Open. The event was also backed by international footballer Gareth Bale and called the Cazoo Open supported by Gareth Bale.

Course
The event has always been played at Celtic Manor in Newport, Wales. From 2000 to 2004 it was played on the Wentwood Hills course. While that course was being redeveloped for the 2010 Ryder Cup, the Wales Open was played from 2005 to 2007 on the par-69 Roman Road course. From 2008, the event has been  played on the Ryder Cup Twenty-Ten course.

The 2021 course layout, at the Twenty-Ten Course

Winners

Source:

Notes

References

External links
Coverage on the European Tour's official site

Former European Tour events
Golf tournaments in Wales
Sport in Newport, Wales
Events in Newport, Wales
Recurring sporting events established in 2000
2000 establishments in Wales